John Sweller (born 1946) is an Australian educational psychologist who is best known for formulating an influential theory of cognitive load. He is currently (i.e., 2020) Professor Emeritus at the University of New South Wales.

Education
Sweller was educated at the University of Adelaide where he received a Bachelor of Arts degree in 1969 followed by a PhD from the department of psychology in 1972. His doctoral research investigated effects of discrimination training on subsequent shift learning in animals.

Career and research
Sweller has authored over 80 academic publications, mainly reporting research on cognitive factors in instructional design, with specific emphasis on the instructional implications of working memory limitations and their consequences for instructional procedures.

Awards and honours
Sweller was elected a Fellow of the Academy of the Social Sciences in Australia (ASSA) in 1993.

References

Living people
Educational psychologists
Fellows of the Academy of the Social Sciences in Australia
1946 births